The Common Terminology Criteria for Adverse Events (CTCAE), formerly called the Common Toxicity Criteria (CTC or NCI-CTC), are a set of criteria for the standardized classification of adverse effects of drugs used in cancer therapy. 
The CTCAE system is a product of the US National Cancer Institute (NCI).

The first Iteration was prior to 1998. In 1999, the FDA released version 2.0. CTCAE version 4.0 in 2009 with an update to y version 4.03 in 2010. The current version 5.0 was released on November 27, 2017. Many clinical trials, now extending beyond oncology, encode their observations based on the CTCAE system.
It uses a range of grades from 1 to 5. Specific conditions and symptoms may have values or descriptive comment for each level, but the general guideline is: 
1 - Mild
2 - Moderate
3 - Severe
4 - Life-threatening
5 - Death
Grade 1: is defined as mild, asymptomatic symptoms. clinical or diagnostic observations only; Intervention not indicated.
Grade 2: is moderate; minimal, local or noninvasive intervention was needed.
Grade 3: Severe symptoms or medically significant but not life-threatening but may be disabling or limit self care in ADL
Grade 4: is Life threatening consequences; urgent or emergent intervention needed
Grade 5: Death related to or due to adverse event

References 

Oncology